Luis Gabriel Ramírez Díaz (14 October 1965 – 8 January 2023) was a Colombian Roman Catholic prelate.

Ramírez Díaz was born in Colombia and was ordained to the priesthood in 1993. He served as bishop of the Roman Catholic Diocese of El Banco, Colombia from 2014 to 2021 and as bishop of the Roman Catholic Diocese of Ocaña, Colombia, from 2021 until his death in 2023.

References

1965 births
2023 deaths
Colombian Roman Catholic bishops
Bishops appointed by Pope Francis
People from Barranquilla